Bill Daniel may refer to:

Bill Daniel (filmmaker) (born 1959), American filmmaker
Bill Daniel (politician) (1915–2006), American politician

See also
William Daniel (disambiguation)
Bill Daniels (disambiguation)